Hoby may refer to:

People with the given name 

 Hoby Brenner (born 1959), former American football tight end
 Hoby Milner (born 1991), an American professional baseball pitcher for the Philadelphia Phillies

People with the surname 

 Alan Hoby (1914-2008), English sports journalist
 Edward Hoby (1560–1617), English diplomat, son of Thomas Hoby
 Lady Margaret Hoby (1571–1633), an English diarist of the Elizabethan period and author of the oldest known diary written by a woman in English
 Peregrine Hoby (1602–1679), English landowner and member of parliament who sat in the House of Commons
 Philip Hoby (1505–1558), English Ambassador to the Holy Roman Empire and Flanders
 Thomas Hoby (1530–1566), English diplomat and translator

Places named Hoby 

 Hoby, Leicestershire, a village in England

Fictional characters named Hoby 

 Hoby Gilman, Texas Ranger played by Robert Culp in Trackdown (TV series)

Other uses 

 Hoby treasure, an archeological discovery in Denmark
 Hugh O'Brian Youth Leadership Foundation, a youth organization in the United States

See also 

 Hoby baronets
 Bräkne-Hoby
 Hobby (disambiguation)

Nicknames